Glasgow Anniesland was a burgh constituency represented in the House of Commons of the Parliament of the United Kingdom from 1997 until 2005, when it was replaced by the larger Glasgow North West, with the exception of Kelvindale which joined Glasgow North.

It elected one Member of Parliament (MP) using the first-past-the-post voting system, and was represented by Donald Dewar until his death in 2000.

Boundaries
The City of Glasgow District electoral divisions of Drumchapel/Blairdardie, Jordanhill/Kelvindale, and Yoker/Knightswood.

Anniesland was situated on the north western outskirts of the city of Glasgow, stretching from Drumchapel on the boundaries with Clydebank to the Botanic Gardens in Glasgow's West End.

Members of Parliament

Elections

Elections of the 2000s

Elections of the 1990s

References 

Historic parliamentary constituencies in Scotland (Westminster)
Constituencies of the Parliament of the United Kingdom established in 1997
Constituencies of the Parliament of the United Kingdom disestablished in 2005
Politics of Glasgow
Drumchapel